Franck Obambou (born 26 June 1995) is a Gabonese professional footballer.

Career
In 2020, Obambou joined Al-Yarmouk in Kuwait. His contract was terminated in May 2020.

International career

International goals
Scores and results list Gabon's goal tally first.

References

External links 
 
 Franck Obambou at Footballdatabase

1987 births
Living people
Gabonese footballers
Association football defenders
2017 Africa Cup of Nations players
Gabon international footballers
Gabonese expatriate footballers
ES Sétif players
Venezuelan Primera División players
Algerian Ligue Professionnelle 1 players
Gabonese expatriate sportspeople in Algeria
Gabonese expatriate sportspeople in Venezuela
Gabonese expatriate sportspeople in Libya
Gabonese expatriate sportspeople in Kuwait
Expatriate footballers in Algeria
Expatriate footballers in Venezuela
Expatriate footballers in Libya
Expatriate footballers in Kuwait
Sportspeople from Libreville
AS Stade Mandji players
Al-Ittihad Club (Tripoli) players
21st-century Gabonese people
2016 African Nations Championship players
Gabon A' international footballers